Saint Alberta of Agen (died ca. 286) was a Roman venerated as a martyr and saint. Supposed to have been one of the first victims of Diocletian's persecutions, she was tortured with Saint Faith and Saint Caprasius in Agen, France. According to tradition, some spectators objected to this, and were subsequently beheaded as well. Alberta is commemorated on March 11.

References

External links
11 March saints at St. Patrick's Church

286 deaths
3rd-century births
3rd-century Romans
3rd-century Christian martyrs
3rd-century Christian saints
Ante-Nicene Christian female saints
3rd-century women